|}

The Hampton Court Stakes is a Group 3 flat horse race in Great Britain open to three-year-old horses. It is run at Ascot over a distance of 1 mile 1 furlongs and 212 yards (2,004 metres), and it is scheduled to take place each year in June.

History
The race has been run under several different titles, and its status has been raised twice since the 1980s. For a period it was an ungraded event called the Churchill Stakes, and it was traditionally part of a Saturday fixture known as the Ascot Heath meeting. This took place on the day after the conclusion of Royal Ascot, which at that time was held over four days. The distance of the Churchill Stakes was 1 mile and 4 furlongs.

The car dealer Milcars began to sponsor the race in 1996, and it became known as the Milcars Conditions Stakes. The event was given Listed status in 1999, and from this point it was called the New Stakes (a former title of Royal Ascot's Norfolk Stakes). It was cut to 1 mile and 2 furlongs in 2000, and the sponsorship of Milcars continued until 2001.

The race was switched to day three of Royal Ascot in 2002, when the meeting was extended to five days to commemorate the Golden Jubilee of Queen Elizabeth II. That year's running was registered as the New Stakes, but for the Royal meeting it was renamed the Hampton Court Stakes. The extension of Royal Ascot was initially intended to be for one year only, but the extra day was retained thereafter. The race was now regularly titled the Hampton Court Stakes, named after Hampton Court, a royal residence of the Tudor period.

The event was promoted to Group 3 level and renamed the Tercentenary Stakes in 2011. Its new title was introduced to mark the 300th anniversary of Ascot Racecourse, which staged its first race meeting in 1711.

In 2017 the race reverted to its previous name, the Hampton Court Stakes.

Records
Leading jockey since 1986 (4 wins):
 Ryan Moore - Glass Harmonium (2009), Cannock Chase (2014), Hunting Horn (2018), Russian Emperor (2020)

Leading trainer since 1986 (4 wins):

 Aidan O'Brien - Moscow Ballet (2004), Indigo Cat (2005), Hunting Horn (2018), Russian Emperor (2020)

Winners since 1986

 The 2005 running took place at York.

See also
 Horse racing in Great Britain
 List of British flat horse races

References

 Paris-Turf:
, 
 Racing Post:
 horseracingintfed.com – International Federation of Horseracing Authorities – Hampton Court Stakes (2018).
 pedigreequery.com – Hampton Court Stakes – Ascot.

Flat races in Great Britain
Ascot Racecourse
Flat horse races for three-year-olds